Shen (神) is the Chinese word for "deity", "spirit", heart, inclusive and community mind, or future mind. The Japanese equivalent is shin. This single Chinese term expresses a range of similar, yet differing, meanings. The first meaning may refer to spirits or gods that are intimately involved in the affairs of the world. Spirits generate entities like rivers, mountains, thunder and stars. A second meaning of shen refers to the human spirit or psyche; it is the basic power or agency within humans that accounts for life, and in order to further life to its fullest potential the spirit is transformed to actualise potential. A third understanding of shen describes an entity as spiritual in the sense of inspiring awe or wonder because it combines categories usually kept separate, or it cannot be comprehended through normal concepts. In traditional Chinese medicine the physician will describe this as the shimmer or gloss that is seen above the surface of a object. If it has a glow, vitality and luster it has good Shen. 

A starting point for an understanding is that shen is associated with Heaven, therefore yang, and Earth is associated with jing, which is yin. Heaven is the origin of the spiritual aspect of humanity and provides ongoing spiritual influences, therefore associated with the Heart, while Earth is the origin of the physical aspect of humankind and traditionally related to our Kidneys or lower Dantian. The ongoing harmonious interaction of Heaven and Earth creates QI therefore Human and is essential to maintaining and creating life. It is said in the classics that " The Human is the best creation of Heaven and Earth". In Traditional Chinese medicine, Taoist, Buddhist, and Chinese folk religious tradition, the balance of yin and yang is important to provide external harmony and internal health within life therefore preventing injury, illness, or harm to body, mind, spirit, or the environment.

Pronunciation

Shén (in rising 2nd tone) is the Modern Standard Chinese pronunciation of  "god, deity; spirit, spiritual, supernatural; awareness, consciousness etc". Reconstructions of shén in Middle Chinese (ca. 6th-10th centuries CE) include dź'jěn (Bernhard Karlgren, substituting j for his "yod medial"), źiɪn (Zhou Fagao), ʑin (Edwin G. Pulleyblank, "Late Middle"), and zyin (William H. Baxter). Reconstructions of shén in Old Chinese (ca. 6th-3rd centuries BCE) include *djěn (Karlgren), *zdjien (Zhou), *djin (Li Fanggui), *Ljin (Baxter), and *m-lin (Axel Schuessler).

Although the etymological origin of shen is uncertain, Schuessler notes a possible Sino-Tibetan etymology; compare Chepang gliŋh "spirit of humans".

The Chinese shen  "spirit; etc." is also present in other East Asian languages. The Japanese Kanji  is pronounced shin or jin in On'yomi (Chinese reading), and kami, kō, or tamashii in Kun'yomi (Japanese reading). The Korean Hanja  is pronounced sin.

The Zihui dictionary notes that  had a special pronunciation shēn (level 1st tone, instead of usual 2nd shén) in the name Shen Shu , one of two "gods of the Eastern Sea", along with Yu Lu .

In the Vietnamese language it is pronounced as thần.

Semantics
Shen'''s polysemous meanings developed diachronically over three millennia. The Hanyu dazidian, an authoritative historical dictionary, distinguishes one meaning for shēn ("Name of a deity) and eleven meanings for shén  translated below:
 Celestial god(s)/spirit(s) of stories/legends, namely, the creator of the myriad things in heaven and earth and the supreme being.
 Spirit; mind, mental faculties; consciousness. Like: concentrated attention; tire the mind; concentrate one's energy and attention.
 Expression, demeanor; consciousness, state of mind.
 Portrait, portraiture.
 Magical, supernatural, miraculous; mysterious, abstruse. Like: ability to divine the unknown, amazing foresight; highly skilled doctor; genius, masterpiece.
 Esteem, respect; valuable, precious.
 Rule, govern, administer.
 Cautious, careful, circumspect.
 Display, arrange, exhibit.
 Dialect. 1. Dignity, distinction. 2. Entrancement, ecstasy. 3. Clever, intelligent.
 Surname, family name.

This dictionary entry for shen lists early usage examples, and many of these 11 meanings were well attested prior to the Han Dynasty. Chinese classic texts use shen in meanings 1 "spirit; god", 2 "spirit, mind; attention", 3 "expression; state of mind", 5 "supernatural", and meaning 6 "esteem". The earliest examples of meaning 4 "portrait" are in Song Dynasty texts. Meanings 7-9 first occur in early Chinese dictionaries; the Erya defines shen in meanings 7 "govern" and 8 "cautious" (and 6, which is attested elsewhere), and the Guangya defines meaning 9 "display". Meaning 10 gives three usages in Chinese dialects (technically "topolects", see Fangyan). Meaning 11 "a surname" is exemplified in Shennong ("Divine Farmer"), the culture hero and inventor of agriculture in Chinese mythology.

The Chinese language has many compounds of shen. For instance, it is compounded with tian  "sky; heaven; nature; god" in tianshen  "celestial spirits; heavenly gods; deities; (Buddhism) deva", with shan  "mountain" in shanshen  "mountain spirit", and hua  "speech; talk; saying; story" in shenhua  "mythology; myth; fairy tale". Several shen "spirit; god" compounds use names for other supernatural beings, for example, ling  "spirit; soul" in shenling  "gods; spirits, various deities", qi  "earth spirit" in shenqi  "celestial and terrestrial spirits", xian  "Xian (Taoism), transcendent" in shenxian  "spirits and immortals; divine immortal", guai  "spirit; devil; monster" in shenguai  "spirits and demons; gods and spirits", and gui  "ghost, goblin; demon, devil" in guishen  "ghosts and spirits; supernatural beings". The earliest discovered character form for shen suggests two components. The right side of the character gives the basic meaning and pronunciation, as well as providing a graphic representation of flashing lightning from the clouds. This visual displays ancient people’s belief that lightning was the manifestation of god.1 The left side displays a modified character shi which pertains to ritual ceremonies, worship, or prayer. This concept originally referred to stone table used for offering ceremonial sacrifices to the gods.  

Wing-Tsit Chan distinguishes four philosophical meanings of this guishen: "spiritual beings", "ancestors", "gods and demons", and "positive and negative spiritual forces".

The primary meaning of shen is translatable as English "spirit, spirits, Spirit, spiritual beings; celestial spirits; ancestral spirits" or "god, gods, God; deity, deities, supernatural beings", etc. Shen is sometimes loosely translated as "soul", but Chinese hun and po distinguishes hun  "spiritual soul" and po  "physical soul". Instead of struggling to translate shen , it can be transliterated as a loanword. The Oxford English Dictionary (2nd ed.) defines shen, "In Chinese philosophy: a god, person of supernatural power, or the spirit of a dead person."

In acupuncture, shen is a pure spiritual energy devoid of memory and personality traits, whereas hun is the spiritual energy associated with the personality and po the energy tied to the sustenance of the physical body. In this system, shen resides in the heart and departs first at death, hun resides in the liver and departs second, and po resides in the lungs and departs last.Shen plays a central role in Christian translational disputes over Chinese terms for God. Among the early Chinese "god; God" names, shangdi  or di was the Shang term, tian  was the Zhou term, and shen was a later usage (see Feng Yu-Lan. Modern terms for "God" include shangdi,  zhu , tianzhu  (esp. Catholics), and shen  (esp. Protestants).

Graphics
The character  for shen exemplifies the most common class in Chinese character classification: xíngshēngzì  "pictophonetic compounds, semantic-phonetic compounds", which combine a radical (or classifier) that roughly indicates meaning and a phonetic that roughly indicates pronunciation. Compare this phonetic element differentiated with the "person radical" in shen  "stretch", the "silk radical" in shen  "official's sash", the "mouth radical" in shen  "chant, drone", the "stone radical" in shen  "arsenic", the "earth radical" in kun  "soil", and the "big radical" in yan  "cover". (See the List of Kangxi radicals.)

Chinese shen  "extend" was anciently a phonetic loan character for shen  "spirit". It is not that the demons have no spirit, but that their spirits do not harm people." (chap. 60). The Shuowen Jiezi defines shen  as shen  and says that in the 7th lunar month when yin forces increase, bodies shenshu  "bind up".

The earliest written forms of shen  "spirit; god" occur in Zhou dynasty bronzeware script and Qin dynasty seal script characters (compare the variants shown on the "Chinese etymology" link below). Although  has not been identified in Shang dynasty oracle bone script records, the phonetic shen  has. This was graphically differentiated between dian  "lightning; electricity" with the "cloud radical" and shen  with the "worship radical", semantically suggesting both "lightning" and "spirits" coming down from the heavens.

See also
 Chinese folk religion  
 Chinese gods and immortals  
 Chinese theology 
 Chinese spiritual world concepts
 Tian & Di
 Shangdi  
 Wufang Shangdi
 Jade Emperor
 Chinese ancestral worship
 Religion in China
 Kami in Shinto religion

References

Further reading
 Dharmananda, Subhuti. 2005. "Towards a spirit at peace: understanding the treatment of shen disorders with Chinese medicine", Institute for Traditional Medicine and Preventive Health Care, Portland, Oregon.  
 Li Leyi. 1993. "Tracing The Roots of Chinese Characters: 500 Cases", Beijing Language and Culture University Press.
 Mateer, C.W. 1901–2. "The meaning of the word shen," Chinese Recorder'' 3.2:61–72, 107–16, 3.3:71–79, 123–32.

External links

 Seal and Bronze Characters, Chinese Etymology
What Is Shen (Spirit)?, Subhuti Dharmananda

Names of God
 
Taoist philosophy
Qigong